Miami Heights is a census-designated place (CDP) in Miami Township, Hamilton County, Ohio, United States. The population was 4,731 at the 2010 census.

Geography
Ohio State Route 264 (Bridgetown Road) is the main road through the community, running east into Mack and Bridgetown and west into Cleves. Its neighbors are Grandview to the north, Mack to the east and south, North Bend to the southwest, and Cleves to the west.

References

Census-designated places in Hamilton County, Ohio
Census-designated places in Ohio